Destinations Career Academy of Colorado is a full-time, diploma granting, public online high school located at 8601 Turnpike Drive, Westminster, Colorado.  It serves grades 9–12.  It is tuition-free for Colorado residents.

In 2014, it had 1,527 students in grades 9–12, and 21 teachers.

Notable alumni 

 Arielle Gold, snowboarder

References

External links

Public high schools in Colorado
Online schools in the United States